Philip Leslie Freier (born 9 February 1955) is an Australian Anglican bishop. He has been the 13th Archbishop of Melbourne since 16 December 2006. He served as Primate of Australia from 28 June 2014 until 31 March 2020. Previously, he served as Bishop of the Northern Territory between 1999 and 2006.

Early life, education and work
Freier was born in Brisbane where he attended Hendra State High School and was raised in the Roman Catholic Church.

In addition to a PhD from James Cook University, he has received the degrees of Master of Educational Studies (MEdSt) from the University of Newcastle, Bachelor of Divinity (BD) from the Melbourne College of Divinity, Diploma of Education (DipEd) from the University of Queensland and Bachelor of Applied Science (BAppSc) from the Queensland Institute of Technology.

Freier was elected a fellow of the Australian Institute of Company Directors (FAICD) in 1995. He worked as a science teacher for six years prior to being ordained.

Ministry
After his ordination in 1982, Freier was a curate in Kowanyama, Queensland, followed by five years as the rector of St Oswald's Banyo, before being appointed the rector of Christ Church Bundaberg. During his time in Kowanyama he studied and became a fluent speaker of one of the local indigenous languages, the Koko-Bera language and is now one of only approximately 50 speakers of this endangered tongue.

In 1999, Freier was elected as the Bishop of the Northern Territory and consecrated a bishop on 22 July at St John's Cathedral (Brisbane). As a supporter of the indigenous Australian communities he pledged to support the Stolen Generations during their healing process. In April 2014, he wrote an opinion piece in Fairfax Media newspapers criticising the Australian government's "Operation Sovereign Borders" policy which places children in immigration detention, arguing that "churches cannot be silent" and must care for "the alien, orphan and widow". Freier has criticised large corporate banks in Australia, arguing that wealth creation should not be "separated from moral and social responsibility" and criticised the Abbott Government for "privileging the financial interest of corporations".

Freier has served as a chaplain to the Royal Australian Air Force Reserve since 2001.

Freier was elected as Anglican Primate of Australia on 28 June 2014, defeating Archbishop of Sydney Glenn Davies. He was installed as Primate by Archbishop of Canterbury Justin Welby in St Paul's Cathedral, Melbourne on 13 August 2014. Freier resigned as Primate effective 31 March 2020 and was replaced by Geoffrey Smith as Primate on 7 April 2020 after the Committee of the Anglican Church's General Synod elected him as Freier's successor.

Personal life

Freier and his wife, Joy, live at "Bishopscourt", East Melbourne. They have two children and three grandchildren. He includes bush-walking, reading and the visual arts among his recreational pursuits.

Honours
  - Chaplain, Most Venerable Order of Saint John (ChStJ)

See also 
 St Paul's Cathedral, Melbourne
 Who's Who in Australia
 Blog: Thoughts + Opinions

References

External links

Profile on ABC website
Speech on Governor of Victoria website

1954 births
Living people
People from Brisbane
Queensland University of Technology alumni
James Cook University alumni
University of Newcastle (Australia) alumni
University of Queensland alumni
Royal Australian Air Force officers
Australian military chaplains
Chaplains of the Order of St John
Anglican bishops of the Northern Territory
Anglican archbishops of Melbourne
21st-century Anglican archbishops
21st-century Anglican bishops in Australia
Primates of the Anglican Church of Australia
Fellows of the Australian Institute of Company Directors
Converts to Anglicanism from Roman Catholicism